is a Japanese synchronized swimmer. The team finished in 5th place.

References 

1991 births
Living people
Japanese synchronized swimmers
Olympic synchronized swimmers of Japan
Synchronized swimmers at the 2012 Summer Olympics
Asian Games medalists in artistic swimming
Artistic swimmers at the 2010 Asian Games
Artistic swimmers at the 2014 Asian Games
Asian Games silver medalists for Japan
Medalists at the 2010 Asian Games
Medalists at the 2014 Asian Games
Universiade medalists in synchronized swimming
Universiade silver medalists for Japan
Medalists at the 2013 Summer Universiade
21st-century Japanese women